Dejan Kerkez (born 20 January 1996) is a Serbian footballer who plays as a defender for Napredak Kruševac.

Club career

ČSK Čelarevo
Born in Novi Sad, Kerkez passed youth categories of ČSK Čelarevo and joined the first team at the age of 16. He made his first senior appearances during the 2013–14 season in the Serbian League Vojvodina. Playing for the team, Kerkez made 36 league and one cup match in a period between 2013 and 2015 and became the youngest captain in club history, promoting in the Serbian First League in summer 2015 under manager Dragan Ivanović. In 2015, he was also on trial at Eredivisie side Heerenveen. During the 2015–16 season, Kerkez made all 30 league matches, and also appeared in final match of the Vojvodina region cup. Shortly after he signed with Spartak, Kerkez returned to ČSK Čelarevo on one-year dual registration. He scored his first goal for the team in 26 fixture match of 2016–17 Serbian First League season, against Proleter Novi Sad.

Spartak Subotica
In June 2016, Kerkez signed a three-year professional contract with Serbian SuperLiga side Spartak Subotica. He made his debut for the new club in a cup match against Voždovac, played on 26 October 2016, under coach Andrey Chernyshov. He also made his SuperLiga debut replacing Đorđe Ivanović in 19 fixture match of the 2016–17 season against Novi Pazar. Kerkez scored his first senior goal in the first SuperLiga he started on the field, in 23 fixture match of the same season, against Javor Ivanjica. Kerkez started the 2017–18 Serbian SuperLiga season as a member of the first squad under coach Aleksandar Veselinović, pairing with Nemanja Ćalasan in defensive line. They also formed the youngest tandem of centre backs at the beginning of season in domestic league. Later, after Đorđe Ivanović left the club in the mid-season, Kerkez was named as a vice-captain behind club captain Vladimir Torbica. Kerkez scored his second goal for Spartak in 1–0 victory over Voždovac in the first match of the championship round in the 2017–18 Serbian SuperLiga campaign.

Marítimo 
On 19 June 2019, Dejan Kerkez signed a contract with Marítimo.

Loan to Mafra 
On 1 February 2021, Kerkez moved to Liga Portugal 2 side Mafra, on a loan deal until the end of the season.

Napredak Kruševac
In June 2021, he returned to Serbia and signed with Napredak Kruševac.

Career statistics

Honours
ČSK Čelarevo
Serbian League Vojvodina: 2014–15

References

External links
 
 
 
 

1996 births
Footballers from Novi Sad
Living people
Serbian footballers
Association football central defenders
FK ČSK Čelarevo players
FK Spartak Subotica players
C.S. Marítimo players
C.D. Mafra players
FK Napredak Kruševac players
Serbian First League players
Serbian SuperLiga players
Primeira Liga players
Serbian expatriate footballers
Expatriate footballers in Portugal
Serbian expatriate sportspeople in Portugal